Brigadier Mohammad Abbas Baig (Urdu:  برگیڈیر جنرل محمد عباس بیگ; September 1917 – 19 April 2008) was a Pakistan Army one-star officer. He was one of the pioneering military officers of the Pakistan Army who was dubbed "Baba-e-Artillery" (father of the Artillery) for his role in establishing this core section of Pakistani army. Abbas Baig's father, Mirza Azam Baig, was a prominent soldier who had fought in the European theatre for the British Army during the Great War (1914–1918). He survived a German gas attack and went on to serve in the personal bodyguard regiment of the emperor of Persia.

British Army career 
Abbas Baig joined the British Army in 1933 and earned commission to the rank of second lieutenant in 1938. When the Second World War broke out, Abbas Baig was sent to Burma to fight the Japanese. He was an outstanding officer who proved his prowess in that conflict.

Pakistan Army 
Soon after the end of the war, the Islamic state of Pakistan was created and, he was one of handful of commissioned officers that formed the lower/middle ranks of the army. No senior officers existed and these ranks were filled by the "loaned" British commanders. The newly established Pakistan Army rapidly developed into an efficient force and it was primarily due to the dedication and hard work of officers such as Abbas Baig.

He became the first Muslim commander of number three self-propelled medium regiment and the first commandant of the Artillery centre in Attock in 1952. Amongst his early achievements were the raising of first artillery division and number one Artillery Corps and played a central role in establishing artillery corps to form the backbone of the army.

Differences with Ayub Khan 
Abbas Baig was one of the most senior officers serving under the army commander General Ayub Khan when he imposed martial law and became president of Pakistan in 1958. Ayub Khan felt threatened by this brilliant young commander and he used his dictatorial powers to remove Abbas Baig from the scene in a mysterious circumstances. On the eve of being promoted from the rank of Brigadier to general, President Ayub not only blocked the promotion orders, he turned them to retirement directive.

Forced Retirement by Ayub Khan 
Abbas Baig had no political ambitions and decided to go quietly as a gentleman officer. Thus, came to a premature end a glittering and brilliant career of what could have been one of the finest military leaders the country has produced. After a long retirement, Brigadier Abbas Baig died in April 2008 in the village of Thatti Mughlah, Jhelum. His legacy continued with all three of his sons having served in the Pakistan army as officers and his grandsons are now carrying on the tradition by serving the very units of the army that Abbas Baig had helped establish more than half a century ago.

References

H
H
2008 deaths
1917 births